Bachmann was a station on the demolished South Beach Branch of the Staten Island Railway. Constructed in 1886 to serve the employees of Bachmann's Brewery, it had two tracks and two side platforms, and was located east of Tompkins Avenue, between Lynhurst and Chestnut Avenues. During a grade crossing elimination project on the South Beach Branch, the station was closed and razed in 1937, due to its proximity to the Rosebank station and the fact that the brewery never reopened after Prohibition. Well after the closure of the Bachmann station, the rest of the South Beach Branch was abandoned in 1953, because of city-operated bus competition.

References

South Beach Branch stations
Railway stations in the United States opened in 1886
Railway stations closed in 1937
1886 establishments in New York (state)
1937 disestablishments in New York (state)